Diego Lazzarich (born 25 October 1961) is an Italian gymnast. He competed in seven events at the 1984 Summer Olympics.

References

1961 births
Living people
Italian male artistic gymnasts
Olympic gymnasts of Italy
Gymnasts at the 1984 Summer Olympics
Sportspeople from the Metropolitan City of Venice
People from Mirano